Bridgetta Clark (born Ruth Porter Clark, January 13, 1891 – November 1980) was an American silent film actress. Her career was brief having appeared in only five films between 1921 and 1926.

Career
Born in Chicago, Illinois, Clark was the granddaughter of Iowa Congressman Lincoln Clark. She adopted the stage name Bridgetta Clark and made her film debut in 1921. Clark's first film was arguably her best known role, a supporting role opposite Rudolph Valentino and Alice Terry in the 1921 epic film The Four Horsemen of the Apocalypse. She would again star alongside Valentino and Terry in a second film, The Conquering Power (1921). She appeared in three more films, one in 1921, one in 1922, and her last, The Greater Glory, in 1926. Following her last film role, she retired from acting. She died in Phoenix, Arizona in November 1980.

Filmography

References

External links

1891 births
1980 deaths
20th-century American actresses
Actresses from Chicago
American film actresses
American silent film actresses